Visesio Moeliku was Tu`i Sigave (King of Sigave), in Wallis and Futuna, from 2004 to 2009.

External links
 The King, seated left, beside King Soane Patita Maituku
  Government website for Wallis and Futuna

Possibly living people
Wallis and Futuna monarchs
Year of birth missing (living people)
Place of birth missing (living people)